Song Reader is a book of sheet music by the American alternative music artist Beck released on December 11, 2012. The book includes 20 songs worth of sheet music and more than 100 pages of art. The book's publisher, McSweeney's, also announced that versions of the songs performed by other musicians would be featured on its website. Links to YouTube and SoundCloud performances of the songs can be contributed to the official web site for the project.

Beck began working on the project in 2004. In 2013 Beck played three concerts with a variety of guests featuring the Song Reader material. He released a record of Song Reader with other musicians in 2014, and plans to release a compilation of fan versions.

Rolling Stone named it 50th on their list of 50 best albums of 2013. The official CD featuring various artists was released on July 29, 2014.

Song list

References

External links
 

Beck
Song books
2012 non-fiction books
American non-fiction books
English-language books
McSweeney's books
Faber and Faber books